Fire engines may refer to: 

 Fire engine, a road vehicle
 The Fire Engines, a Scottish post-punk group
 Fully Integrated Robotised Engine, a series of car engines by Fiat
 "Fire Engine", a Railway Series story from the 1984 book James and the Diesel Engines
 "Fire Engines", a song from The Wiggles' album Here Comes a Song

Disambiguation pages